David Tyson Smith is an American attorney and politician serving as a member of the Missouri House of Representatives from the 46th district. He assumed office after a special election in April 2021 for district 45. Then after redistricting in 2022, his home placed in district 46.

Early life and education 
Smith was born and raised in Columbia, Missouri. He earned a Bachelor of Science degree in business administration from the University of Missouri and a Juris Doctor from the Tulane University Law School.

Career 
Smith worked as an attorney in New Orleans before returning to Columbia, where he founded Smith and Parnell LLC. In 2021, Smith was selected by the Boone County Democratic Committee to succeed Kip Kendrick in the Missouri House of Representatives. Smith later competed in a special election to fill the remainder of Kendrick's term.

Electoral History

References 

Living people
Missouri lawyers
People from Columbia, Missouri
University of Missouri alumni
Tulane University Law School alumni
Democratic Party members of the Missouri House of Representatives
Year of birth missing (living people)